Vasco Martins may refer to the following people:

Vasco Martins de Alvelos, 13th-14th century Portuguese bishop 
Vasco Martins (bishop), 15th century Portuguese bishop 
Vasco Martins, Cape Verdean musician